Bill Atwood  is an American bishop of the International Diocese in the Anglican Church in North America, and was a suffragan bishop in the Diocese of All Saints' in the Anglican Church of Kenya.

Atwood, who lives in Frisco, Texas, has been General Secretary of the Ekklesia society, an orthodox Anglican networking and development agency, since 1995, having left the U.S. Episcopal Church in 2006.

References

21st-century Anglican bishops of the Anglican Church of Kenya
Anglican bishops of All Saints' Cathedral
Bishops of the Anglican Church in North America
Living people
Anglican realignment people
Former American Episcopal clergy
Frisco, Texas
Year of birth missing (living people)
21st-century American clergy